Abul Khair may refer to:

 Abū l-Khayr al-Ishbīlī, also called Abul Khayr, 11th century Andalusian Arab agriculturalist
 Abul Khair (Bengali intellectual) (1929-1971), Bangladeshi martyred intellectual in 1971
 Abul Khair (legislator), Burmese police officer and politician
 Abul Khair Khan, 18th century Kazakh leader
 Abu'l-Khayr Khan, 15th century Uzbek leader
 Abul Khair (actor), Bangladeshi actor
 Abul Khair Kashfi, a Persian scholar
 Abul Khair Litu, Bangladeshi businessman
 Abul Khair Bhuiyan, Bangladeshi politician